Hewett may refer to:

Hewett (surname)
Hewett, Wisconsin, a town in the United States
Hewett, South Australia, a town
Hewett gas field, UK natural gas field

See also
Hewitt (disambiguation)